Issifu Omoro Tanko Amadu (born 11 September 1957) is a Supreme Court judge of the Republic of Ghana.  He was appointed the Justice of the High Court between 2008 and 2012. He became an Appeal court judge from 2012. He was nominated by the president Nana Akufo-Addo. He is the first Muslim to serve on Ghana's Supreme Court.

Personal life and education 
Issifu was born on 11 September 1957 in Dodowa in the Greater Accra Region of Ghana. He attended District Assembly Primary School and Methodist Middle School, both located in Dodowa for his basic education. He later had his secondary education at Ghanata Senior High School and Ghana Senior High School situated in Koforidua. He obtained his LLB at the University of Ghana and moved on to the Ghana School of Law for his professional law course. He sojourned in Nigeria before obtaining a professional law course at the Nigeria School of Law.

Career 
After gaining some practical experience with Azinyo Chambers located in Accra, he worked with some Nigerian law firms such as A.C Mathews & Co. and later as an Associate Member of Alao Aka Bashorun & Co. both located in Lagos. He worked as a lawyer in Nigeria for nineteen years.

He founded his own firm and became the Principal of Amadu & Co. in 1997 and after the Senior Partner Amadu, Ansah-Obiri & Co.

Issifu appointed to the High Court in 2008 and was promoted to the Court of Appeal in 2012.

Nomination 
He was sworn into office by the president Nana Akufo-Addo. It was done at a ceremony at the Jubilee House. His nomination was approved by the Parliament of Ghana with other three judges after they were vetted. The rest were Justice Clemence Jackson Honyenuga, Professor. Henrietta J.A.N Mensa-Bonsu, and Mr. Emmanuel Yonny Kulendi.

Awards 
He received a Humanity Award from the Humanity Magazine International for inspiring Zongo communities in the field of law.

Later life 
In May 2021, he joined Godfred Yeboah Dame to honor an invitation by Osman Nuhu Sharubutu to discuss some issues in Ghana and how to chart a way to resolve them amicably.

See also
 Supreme Court of Ghana
 List of judges of the Supreme Court of Ghana

References 

Living people
21st-century Ghanaian judges
People from Greater Accra Region
University of Ghana alumni
Ghana School of Law alumni
Justices of the Supreme Court of Ghana
Ghana Senior High School (Koforidua) alumni
1957 births